Information Visualization is a quarterly peer-reviewed academic journal that publishes covers the field of information science, in particular regarding theories, methodologies, techniques and evaluations of information visualization and its applications. The editor-in-chief is Chaomei Chen (Drexel University). It was established in 1998 by Palgrave Publishing, and is currently published by SAGE Publications.

Abstracting and indexing 
Information Visualization is abstracted and indexed in:
 Applied Science & Technology Index
 Computer Abstracts International Database
 FLUIDEX
 Library Information Science Abstracts
 Scopus

References

External links 
 

SAGE Publishing academic journals
English-language journals
Information science journals
Quarterly journals
Publications established in 2002